The Apex AP-0 is a all-electric concept sports car announced in 2020 by the British/Hong Kong sportscar company Apex Motors, and it went for production in late 2022 with deliveries expected in Mid 2023.

It is powered by a 650 bhp rear-mounted electric motor with 580 Nm of torque and a 90 kWh lithium-ion battery.

Designed by Guy Colborne, the AP-0 has a claimed kerb weight of 1200 kg due to the AP-0's monocoque carbon chassis, with modular spaceframe and a central spine.

In popular culture
The APEX AP-0 appears as a playable blueprint-unlockable vehicle in the mobile game Asphalt 9: Legends. added in "British Season Update" along with two other new cars: McLaren Speedtail & McLaren F1 LM. This also the first Asphalt appearance of new manufacturer, APEX.

References

External links
 

Concept cars
Cars introduced in 2020
Electric sports cars